Urban Extension Road-II (UER II) or NH-344M is an upcoming 75.7 km long, 6 lanes (main expressway) & 4 lanes (service roads) wide access-controlled expressway in Delhi NCR, India. It would start from National Highway 44 at Alipur then passes from Rohini, Mundka, Najafgarh, Dwarka and end at Delhi–Gurgaon Expressway on National Highway 48 near Mahipalpur. Its main route forms a semicircle on the western side of Delhi, additionally it has two side spurs - one from Bawana in Northwest Delhi to Sonipat in Bawana's North and second in west Delhi from between Tikri border & Najafgarh to NH9 Bahadurgarh south bypass.   Delhi NCT has 4 concentric ring roads around it - namely Inner Ring Road; Outer Ring Road; third ring outside it formed by the combination of UER-II & Chilla-Okhla Expressway, and fourth ring formed by the combination of part of Dwarka Expressway (from Tikampur) & Gurugaon-Ghata Expressway, Gurgaon-Sohna Elevated Corridor Expressway, Sohna-Faridabad section of Delhi-Mumbai Expressway, Faridabad–Noida–Ghaziabad Expressway (FNG), Ghaziabad-Narela Expressway (planned) and Rai-Narela-Bahadurgarh-Gurgaon Expressway (meet Dwarka Expressway at Tikampur in Gurugaon). Outside these ring roads, NCR region will have 3 Regional Circular Expressways (first of which is the existing combination of WPE and EPE) and 3 Zonal Circular Expressways (ZCE).

The project also features two 4 lane spurs
 NH-344P to Bahadurgarh Bypass
 NH-344P to Barwasni Bypass

History
In the year 2000, DDA's NCR Transport Plan 2021 conceived the UER-II project, which did not materialize due to financial viability and land procurement problems. In 2018, NHAI took over the implementation of UER-II phase-1 on payment of INR4000 crore financial viability gap funding by DDA, while DDA itself simultaneously undertook the construction of phase-2.

Route

The access-controlled UER-II expressway project phase 1 & 2 have a main 74.98 km long 6-lane semi-circular route on western side of Delhi NCT, with two additional spurs - the 29.6 km long 4-lane Bawana-Sonipat spur in northwest and second 7.3 km long 6-lane Najafgarh-Bahadurgarh spur in west. UER-II is an at grade expressway with elevated flyovers at intersections.

 Main route:

 Phase-1 - covers northwest quadrant from NH44  Alipur to NH48 IGI Airport Shiv Murti: 

 Main route: UER-II begins in north from NH44 between Bankoli & Alipur, and then via Bawana Industrial Area, Rohini, Mundka, Bakkarwala, Najafgarh and meets Dwarka Expressway near ICC & IGI Airport tunnel, end at NH48 Shiv Murti on eastern end of IGI.

 Spurs: both are part of phase-1.

 Bawana-Sonipat spur: from Bawana in northwest Delhi to its north to Barwasani at 352A in Sonipat in Haryana.

 Najafgarh-Bahadurgarh spur: from UER north of Najafgarh to its northwest to 9 Bahadurgarh south bypass.

 Phase-2 - covers southwest quadrant:

 Rangpuri Bypass Expressway: 6-lane expressway from Shiv Murti to Nelson Mandela Marg in Vasant Kunj with interchanges at Andheria Mor and NH148A Anuvrat Marg-Mehraul intersection, then Mehrauli to Badarpur at NH19.

 Rangpuri-Mahrauli-Badarpur Expressway: 6-lane expressway from Rangpuri Bypass, via Saket-Mehrauli-Tughlakabad, to Badarpur interchange, with elevated corridor over the Vasant Vihar T-section, Khanpur, Hamdard Nagar and Maa Anandmayi Marg intersections. 

 Kalindi Bypass: connects at Badarpur interchange.

 Phase-3 - covers eastern semicircle:

 Badarpur-Noida Expressway (BNE): from Badarpur interchange, over the yamuna river via new bridge, to Noida-Greater Noida Bundh Expressway (NGNBE) at Asgarpur Jagir & Noida-Greater Noida Expressway (NGNE) at Noida Sector-98 interchange - both of which converge at Okhla Bird Sanctuary.

 Chilla-Okhla Sanctuary Expressway (i.e. Chilla-Shahadra Drain Elevated Road): from Noida end of DND Flyway at Chilla, then over and along the Shahdara Drain to Okhla Bird Sanctuary (beginning of Noida-Greater Noida Expressway and Noida-Greater Noida Bundh Expressway).

 Chilla-Akshardham-Agraula section of Delhi–Saharanpur–Dehradun Expressway: from Chilla-Okhla Expressway (Chilla-Shahadra Drain Elevated Road), via Akshardham temple & Loni to Agraula.

 Alipur-Burari-Agraula-Expressway: from NH44 Alipur at Splash Water Park,  via Hiranki & then along Bund Road, then Burari bridge over Yamuna river to Agraula where it will connect to Delhi–Saharanpur–Dehradun Expressway, Tronica City and NH709B. 

 Spurs: 

 Burari-Loni-Ghaziabad-Okhla - North Delhi-Ghaziabad inner loop: will pass through Khanpur Japti, Loni, south of Hindon Airport, Chaudhary Charan Singh Marg (Bhopura, Saheed Nagar, Kaushambhi & Ghazipur),  and via Ghazipur Road to DND Flyway.

 Agraula-Jawli-Ghaziabad Expressway - North Delhi-Ghaziabad outer loop: Alipur-Burari-Agraula will continue to Jawli and then to NH9 Morti interchange in Ghaziabad where it will meet Faridabad-Noida-Ghaziabad Expressway (FNG).

Construction

Phase 1 
The NHAI has divided the construction work of UER II project into 5 packages and its construction cost is around ₹7,716 crores.

Status updates
 Aug 2021: UER II get August 2023 deadline.
 Aug 2021: Delhi Govt gives permission to transplant 6600 trees.
 Nov 2021: H G Infra Engineering receives appointed date for Package 1 from NHAI

See also

 List of Expressways in India
 Delhi–Amritsar–Katra Expressway
 Delhi–Mumbai Expressway

References

Highways in India
Transport in Delhi
Transport in Ghaziabad, Uttar Pradesh